Aaron Craig Barnes (born 21 December 1971 in Tūrangi) is a former New Zealand cricketer who played for the Auckland between 1993 and 2005. In 2003-04 he and Matthew Horne added 347* for the fifth wicket against Northern Districts at Eden Park, a club record.

See also
 List of Auckland representative cricketers

References

External links
 
 

1971 births
Living people
New Zealand cricketers
Auckland cricketers
Herefordshire cricketers
North Island cricketers
People from Tūrangi
Cricketers from Waikato